Jumurda Manor is a manor house in Jumurda Parish, Madona Municipality in the Vidzeme region of Latvia. It was built after 1856 in Eclectic style. Vandalized during the Revolution of 1905, the manor was restored in 1907. After 1929 it housed the Jumurda primary school for many years. The estate buildings and manor house are gradually being renovated to create a resort hotel complex.

See also
List of palaces and manor houses in Latvia

References

External links
  History of the Jumurda Estate
  Jumurda Manor

Manor houses in Latvia
Madona Municipality
Kreis Wenden
Vidzeme